Marjut Turunen  (born 18 January 1992) is a Finnish ski orienteering competitor.

She won a silver medal in the middle distance at the 2015 World Ski Orienteering Championships, behind Milka Reponen.

References

1992 births
Living people
Finnish orienteers
Ski-orienteers